C-X-C motif chemokine ligand 10 (CXCL10) also known as Interferon gamma-induced protein 10 (IP-10) or small-inducible cytokine B10 is an 8.7 kDa protein that in humans is encoded by the CXCL10 gene. C-X-C motif chemokine 10 is a small cytokine belonging to the CXC chemokine family.

Gene 

The gene for CXCL10 is located on human chromosome 4 in a cluster among several other CXC chemokines.

Function 

CXCL10 is secreted by several cell types in response to IFN-γ. These cell types include monocytes, endothelial cells and fibroblasts. CXCL10 has been attributed to several roles, such as chemoattraction for monocytes/macrophages, T cells, NK cells, and dendritic cells,  promotion of T cell adhesion to endothelial cells, antitumor activity, and inhibition of bone marrow colony formation and angiogenesis.

This chemokine elicits its effects by binding to the cell surface chemokine receptor CXCR3.

Structure 

The three-dimensional crystal structure of this chemokine has been determined under 3 different conditions to a resolution of up to 1.92 Å.

Biomarkers

CXCL9, CXCL10 and CXCL11 have proven to be valid biomarkers for the development of heart failure and left ventricular dysfunction, suggesting an underlining pathophysiological relation between levels of these chemokines and the development of adverse cardiac remodeling.

Clinical significance 

Baseline pre-treatment plasma levels of CXCL10 are elevated in patients chronically infected with hepatitis C virus (HCV) of genotypes 1 or 4 who do not achieve a sustained viral response (SVR) after completion of antiviral therapy. CXCL10 in plasma is mirrored by intrahepatic  CXCL10 mRNA, and both strikingly predict the first days of elimination of HCV RNA  (“first phase decline”) during interferon/ribavirin therapy for all HCV genotypes. This also applies for patients co-infected with HIV, where pre-treatment IP-10 levels below 150 pg/mL are predictive of a favorable response, and may thus be useful in encouraging these otherwise difficult-to-treat patients to initiate therapy. The pathogen Leishmania major utilizes a protease, GP63, that cleaves CXCL10, implicating CXCL10 in host defense mechanisms of certain intracellular pathogens like Leishmania.

References

External links

Further reading 

 
 

Cytokines